Tillandsia crista-galli is a species of flowering plant in the genus Tillandsia. This species is endemic to Mexico. The specific epithet has also been spelt crista-gallii.

References

crista-gallii
Endemic flora of Mexico